ME4 or ME-4 may refer to:
 ME-4 process, a process for developing motion picture film
 Maine's 4th congressional district
 Maine State Route 4
 Masters Edition IV, a Magic: The Gathering expansion
 Mass Effect: Andromeda, a video game